"Georgia" is the debut single by Canadian country music singer Carolyn Dawn Johnson, released in September 2000 from her debut album Room with a View (2001).  The song peaked at number 25 on the Billboard Hot Country Singles & Tracks chart (now Hot Country Songs) and number 98 on the Billboard Hot 100. It also reached number 4 on the Canadian RPM Country Tracks chart before the magazine ceased publication. The song was written by Johnson and Troy Verges.

It features a backing vocal from Martina McBride.

Music video
The music video was directed by Brent Hedgecock and premiered in late 2000.

Chart performance
"Georgia" debuted at number 74 on the U.S. Billboard Hot Country Singles & Tracks chart for the week of September 16, 2000.

Notes

References

[ Room with a View] review at AllMusic

2000 songs
2000 debut singles
Carolyn Dawn Johnson songs
Songs written by Carolyn Dawn Johnson
Songs written by Troy Verges
Song recordings produced by Paul Worley
Arista Nashville singles
Songs about Georgia (U.S. state)